Peisey-Nancroix is a commune in the Savoie department in the Auvergne-Rhône-Alpes region in south-eastern France.

Geography

Climate

Peisey-Nancroix has a humid continental climate (Köppen climate classification Dfb) closely bordering on a oceanic climate (Cfb).

See also
Communes of the Savoie department

References

Communes of Savoie